Global Yellow Pages Limited (GYP), previously known as Yellow Pages Singapore, is a real estate developer and digital search company. It was listed on the Singapore Exchange on 9 December 2004. The company was based in Singapore, New Zealand and Australia. The company started in 1967 with the publication of the Yellow Pages telephone directories. Until 2015, the company's core activities were the publication of consumer and business directories and the sale of advertising in these directories. Specialised directories published by the company included Visitor's Guide Singapore and Singapore Infocomm Directory. Other services included online directories (Internet Yellow Pages) as well as database, digital marketing and other marketing-related services.

At its Extraordinary General Meeting on 4 May 2015, shareholders approved the proposed diversification of the Company's core business to property investment, development and management. On 1 August 2017, GYP announced the publication of its final edition (2018) of the Yellow Pages print directories. It also announced the licensing of its brand and digital, data and online offerings to Yellow Pages Pte Ltd, a joint venture company.  As of 31 August 2017, the company has a property portfolio of $126 million. As of 2017, the company has two wholly owned subsidiaries, GYP Properties and Global Food Retail Group.

History

Yellow Pages Singapore

Singapore Phone Book Evolution
 1962: as Singapore Telephone Book Telephone Directory (English-Chinese version) first published as a combined-volume bound white and yellow pages directory, the issue date is July 1962 and published by General Telephone Directory Company.
 1965: The conversion from 2 to 4-column book.
 1970: The White and Yellow Pages directories are separated into 2-books as a single-volume bounded directories with the change of issue date from July to October 1970 and published by General Telephone Directory Company (Singapore) Private Limited.
 1990:
 The Yellow Pages directory are no longer bound in a single-volume, later the market-segmented directories as: Yellow Pages - Buying Guide (B) and Yellow Pages - Commercial/Industrial Guide (C).
 The White Pages directory are no longer bounded in a single-volume, later as White Pages - Business Listings and White Pages - Residential Listings (Central Singapore, East Singapore, North Singapore, North-East Singapore and West Singapore)
 2009: As Global Yellow Pages, as Yellow Pages - Business, Yellow Pages - Consumer and Yellow Pages® Hotel.
 2017: Global Yellow Pages announced that it will cease publication of Yellow Pages print directories from 2018.

GYP Properties 
GYP Properties is a holding company for GYP's New Zealand properties. It owns Remarkables Residences and Pakuranga Plaza, both registered in New Zealand.

Global Retail Group 
Global Food Retail Group, a subsidiary of Singapore-listed Global Yellow Pages. It bought Australian ice-cream and hot dog chain Wendy's Supa Sundaes for $10 million in September 2014.

See also
 List of Yellow Pages 
 Electronic Yellow Pages

References

Yellow pages